Eduard Lorenz (born February 12, 1921) was an SS-Unterscharführer (Corporal) and member of staff at Auschwitz concentration camp. He was prosecuted at the Auschwitz Trial.

Born in Neudorf (Sudetenland), Lorenz was German by nationality with Czechoslovakian citizenship. He was a farmer. After the invasion of Czechoslovakia by the Third Reich, he joined the SS and was sent to the front. Due to injury, he was unfit for further frontline service and was dispatched to Auschwitz at the end of January 1942. In August 1942 he worked as a guard, and then worked as a driver distributing food in the camp.

Lorenz was tried by the Supreme National Tribunal in Kraków and received a 15-year prison sentence for abusing prisoners. He was acquitted of murder by entering a plea. Due to an amnesty, he was released from prison early, on December 18, 1955.

Bibliography
 Cyprian T., Sawicki J., Siedem wyroków Najwyższego Trybunału Narodowego, Poznań 1962

References

1921 births
SS non-commissioned officers
People convicted in the Auschwitz trial
Possibly living people
Auschwitz concentration camp personnel
German farmers
German people convicted of crimes against humanity